Aaron Samuel may refer to:

Aaron Samuel Olanare, Nigerian footballer
Aaron Samuel Kaidanover, Polish-Lithuanian rabbi
Aaron Samuel ben Moses Shalom of Kremnitz, author